Aurobindo Sarani (formerly Grey Street) is one of the oldest and most congested main roads in north part of Kolkata. Many buses, taxis and auto-rickshaws use the road. It connects Ultadanga with Shobhabazar. West of Gouribari, Ultadanga Main Road (Bidhannagar Road) becomes Aurobindo Sarani. It becomes Shobhabazar Street after crossing Jatindra Mohan Avenue (Shobhabazar Petrol Station). This road's name is a tribute for Aurobindo Ghosh, a famous freedom-fighter and Hindu saint of India.

Aurobindo Sarani consists of several important places, such as APC Road crossing, Bidhan Sarani crossing and Jatindra Mohan Avenue crossing. This is a very busy road, consisting of one of Kolkata's biggest markets, the Hatibagan Market, at Bidhan Sarani Crossing.

The road is connected to Ultadanga Main Road (Bidhannagar Road) with Arobindo Setu (Gouribari Bridge), over one of Kolkata's canals. The bridge was opened in 1974 and connects Khanna/Gouribari (Maniktala) with Ultadanga. The bridge is poorly maintained.

References

Streets in Kolkata